Def Jux Presents is a 2001 compilation album released by American hip hop record label Definitive Jux.

"DPA (As Seen on TV)" peaked at number 36 on the Billboard Hot Rap Songs chart.

Critical reception

Victor W. Valdivia of AllMusic called Def Jux Presents "a way to introduce newcomers to the formidable talent at the label" and "a collection of great underground hip-hop".

In 2015, Fact placed the album at number 37 on its "100 Best Indie Hip-Hop Records of All Time" list.

Track listing

Personnel
Credits adapted from liner notes.

 El-P – vocals (1, 2, 7), production (1, 2, 3, 5, 7)
 Mr. Len – turntables (1, 2, 3, 5, 7), production (7)
 Ill Bill – vocals (2)
 Vordul Mega – vocals (3, 5)
 Vast Aire – vocals (3, 5)
 RJD2 – production (4)
 Aesop Rock – vocals (6), production (6)

References

External links
 

2001 compilation albums
Definitive Jux compilation albums
Albums produced by Aesop Rock
Albums produced by El-P
Albums produced by RJD2
Record label compilation albums
Hip hop compilation albums
East Coast hip hop compilation albums